"Numa Numa" is an Internet meme based on a video by American vlogger Gary Brolsma made after the song "Dragostea Din Tei" as performed by Moldovan pop group O-Zone. Brolsma's video, entitled "Numa Numa Dance", was released on December 6, 2004, on the website Newgrounds.com under the username "Gman250" and shows Brolsma lip-synching the hit song with lively gesticulations and dance moves. The video title is derived from the Romanian words "" that occur in the refrain of O-Zone's song. It was the first Numa Numa-themed video to gain widespread attention. 

"Numa Numa Dance" has since spawned many parody videos, including those created for the "New Numa Contest", sponsored by Brolsma, which promised US $45,000 in prize money for submissions. His original video was named 41st in the 2006 broadcast of 100 Greatest Funny Moments by Channel 4 in the UK. The video was featured on Channel 4's Virtually Famous, and was ranked No. 1 in VH1's "40 Greatest Internet Superstars" in March 2007.

The Viral Factory estimated that by November 27, 2006, the video had been viewed over 700 million times.

History 
On Newgrounds, "Numa Numa Dance" has since been seen more than eighteen million times. From there it has been copied onto hundreds of other websites and blogs.  According to a November 27, 2006, report by the BBC, based on page impression figures collated by viral marketing company The Viral Factory, "Numa Numa Dance" was the second-most-watched viral video of all time, with 700 million views, losing out only to "Star Wars kid". Brolsma received mainstream media coverage from ABC's Good Morning America, NBC's The Tonight Show with Jay Leno, and VH1's Best Week Ever and the "Numa Numa" video was listed as number 1 on VH1s Top 40 Internet Superstars. According to The New York Times, however, he was an "unwilling and embarrassed Web celebrity". He cancelled media appearances but reappeared in September 2006 with a professionally produced video, "New Numa", featuring a song specially made for him by Variety Beats.  This video, hosted on YouTube, marked the start of the "New Numa Contest", which promised US $45,000 in prize money and a US $25,000 award to the winner.

On May 23, 2008, Brolsma was featured, along with many other internet celebrities in the music video for Weezer's song Pork and Beans, featured on their self-titled 2008 album Weezer, also known as the Red Album.

On December 5, 2014, Brolsma uploaded a video entitled "Numa Numa 10-Year Reunion" to Newgrounds, a video of him lip-syncing several songs, including "Shake It Off" by Taylor Swift, "Don't Think Twice, It's All Right" by Bob Dylan, and "Firework" by Katy Perry. Both the original video and the 10-Year Reunion video have since been deleted by the Newgrounds moderation team due to music licensing issues and the site's focus on animations. Brolsma later stated in an interview, "...I found "Dragostea Din Tei" in another (I believe it was Japanese) flash animation with cartoon cats".

On November 20, 2022, an emote based on the viral dance was released in Epic Games' Fortnite: Battle Royale as a collaboration with Brolsma and O-Zone.

Gary Brolsma 

Gary William Brolsma (born January 14, 1986) is an American vlogger and musician who gained worldwide attention after posting the Numa Numa Dance video in 2004.

He made appearances on ABC's Good Morning America, NBC's The Tonight Show, and VH1's Best Week Ever. A story in The Believer (June/July 2006) explored the song's spread and global homogenization, while arguing that Brolsma's video "singlehandedly justifies the existence of webcams... It’s a movie of someone who is having the time of his life, wants to share his joy with everyone, and doesn’t care what anyone else thinks". In 2007, he was voted the Number 1 Internet Icon by VH1 in their 40 Greatest Internet Superstars list, beating the Star Wars kid who placed at Number 2.

On October 15, 2007, The New York Times reported that Brolsma had recently collaborated on a video with lonelygirl15's Glenn Rubenstein, as well as Chad Vader's Aaron Yonda and Matt Sloan, as a part of Canon's Battle of the Viral Video Superstars. In 2008 Brolsma released his first album, Weird Tempo. In 2019 he released his second album, Haunted House of Pancakes.

References

External links
 

2006 YouTube videos
Viral videos
Internet memes introduced in 2004